Esmond Million (born 15 March 1938) is a former football goalkeeper.

Playing career
Million played for Middlesbrough from 1956 to 1962. He joined Bristol Rovers in 1962.

In April 1963, he took a £300 bribe to throw a match. The ploy failed and Million was exposed amid the 1964 British football match-fixing scandal. After having been banned from football for life, he emigrated with his family to Canada where he became active in professional ice hockey. He would eventually return to Britain and is now thought to be living in Tunbridge Wells, Kent.

References

1938 births
Living people
Middlesbrough F.C. players
Bristol Rovers F.C. players
Association football goalkeepers
English footballers
Sportspeople involved in betting scandals